Leinstrand Church is a parish church of the Church of Norway in Trondheim municipality in Trøndelag county, Norway. It is located in the Leinstrand area in the city of Trondheim. It is one of the churches for the Byneset og Leinstrand parish which is part of the Heimdal og Byåsen prosti (deanery) in the Diocese of Nidaros. The red, wooden church was built in a long church style in 1673 by the architect Ole Jonsen Hindrum. The church seats about 200 people.

History
The earliest existing historical records of the church date back to the year 1533, but the church was not new that year. The old church may have been built during the 14th or 15th century. The building was consecrated on 17 September 1673. In 1783, parts of the church collapsed due to a weak foundation and shifting soil. The following summer, the church was rebuilt on the same site with a reinforced foundation, mostly using recycled materials from the old church. At the same time, the church was enlarged and restored. From 1831-1837, the church underwent a large renovation. In 1905, a new tower on the west side of the building was constructed and at the same time, the old flat ceiling above the nave was replaced with a vaulted ceiling.

Media gallery

See also
List of churches in Nidaros

References

Churches in Trondheim
Churches in Trøndelag
Long churches in Norway
Wooden churches in Norway
17th-century Church of Norway church buildings
Churches completed in 1673
14th-century establishments in Norway